Buccanodon is a bird genus in the African barbet family (Lybiidae) which was formerly included in the Capitonidae and sometimes in the Ramphastidae. It contains two species, both referred to as the yellow-spotted barbets.

This genus was formerly considered a monotypic taxon just containing B. duchaillui, but a study published in 2019 found populations west of the Dahomey Gap to constitute a new, distinct species, B. dowsetti. Both species are nearly identical and can only be reliably distinguished in the field by their songs and their distribution.

Species

References 

 
Bird genera
Barbets
Taxa named by George Robert Gray